Waldron is a city in Scott County, Arkansas, United States. Its population was 3,386 at the 2020 census. The city is the county seat of Scott County.

History
Waldron was platted in 1845 by surveyor W. P. Waldron, and named for him. A post office called Waldron has been in operation since 1846. Waldron was incorporated in 1875. Waldron was reached by the Arkansas Western Railroad from Heavener, Oklahoma in 1901. Later called the Arkansas Western Railway, a subsidiary of and subsequently incorporated into the Kansas City Southern, the line is now leased to and operated by the Arkansas Southern Railroad.

Geography
Waldron is located at  (34.899191, -94.091483). Waldron is located approximately 38 miles south of Fort Smith, near the Poteau River.

Demographics

2020 census

As of the 2020 United States census, there were 3,386 people, 1,328 households, and 854 families residing in the city.

2000 census
As of the 2000 census, there were 3,508 people, 1,430 households, and 899 families residing in the city. The racial makeup of the city was 90.42% White, 0.14% Black or African American, 0.91% Native American, 0.11% Asian, 7.16% from other races, and 1.25% from two or more races. 15.31% of the population were Hispanic or Latino of any race.

There were 1,430 households, out of which 31.3% had children under the age of 18 living with them, 45.9% were married couples living together, 11.3% had a female householder with no husband present, and 37.1% were non-families. 33.0% of all households were made up of individuals, and 16.8% had someone living alone who was 65 years of age or older. The average household size was 2.38 and the average family size was 3.00.

In the city, the population was spread out, with 26.9% under the age of 18, 10.2% from 18 to 24, 25.6% from 25 to 44, 19.6% from 45 to 64, and 17.8% who were 65 years of age or older. The median age was 35 years. For every 100 females, there were 96.6 males. For every 100 females age 18 and over, there were 87.8 males.

The median income for a household in the city was $21,921, and the median income for a family was $26,829. Males had a median income of $25,256 versus $16,136 for females. The per capita income for the city was $12,193. About 22.8% of families and 25.9% of the population were below the poverty line, including 31.1% of those under age 18 and 14.7% of those age 65 or over.

Education 
Public education for elementary and secondary school students is primarily provided by the Waldron School District, which leads to graduation from Waldron High School. The district and school mascot and athletic emblem is the Bulldog with orange and black serving as the district and school colors.

Notable people

Evelyn Ammons, member of the Arkansas House of Representatives 
Doak S. Campbell, founder of Florida State University
Gary Darnell, college football coach
James Farley, silent film actor
Ashley McBryde, country music singer-songwriter
Terry Rice, member of the Arkansas House of Representatives

Climate
The climate in this area is characterized by hot, humid summers and generally mild to cool winters. According to the Köppen Climate Classification system, Waldron has a humid subtropical climate, abbreviated "Cfa" on climate maps.

References

External links
 Encyclopedia of Arkansas History & Culture entry: Waldron (Scott County)

Cities in Scott County, Arkansas
Cities in Arkansas
County seats in Arkansas